The Rural Municipality of Big River No. 555 is a rural municipality (RM) in the Canadian province of Saskatchewan within Census Division No. 16 and  Division No. 5.

History 
The RM of Big River No. 555 incorporated as a rural municipality on October 1, 1977.

Geography

Communities and localities 
The following urban municipalities are surrounded by the RM.

Towns
 Big River

The following unincorporated communities are located in the RM.

Organized hamlets
Nesslin Lake
Phillips Grove

Localities
 Bodmin
 Chitek
 Chitek Lake
 Cowan Lake
 Delaronde
 Ladder Lake
 Ladder Valley

Demographics 

Government 
The RM of Big River No. 555 is governed by an elected municipal council and an appointed administrator that meets on the second Monday of every month. The Reeve of the RM is Clint Panter while its Administrator is Michael Yuzik. The RM's office is located in Big River.

See also 
List of rural municipalities in Saskatchewan

References

External links 

B

Division No. 16, Saskatchewan